Chris Barclay (born October 15, 1983) is a former American football coach and former running back who is the current running backs coach for the Louisville Cardinals. He played college football at Wake Forest. He was signed by the Cleveland Browns as an undrafted free agent in 2006 and last played for the New York Sentinels.

Barclay has also been a member of the Berlin Thunder, Tennessee Titans, New Orleans Saints, and Atlanta Falcons.

College career
Barclay capped a standout collegiate career at Wake Forest in 2005, when he was named as the Atlantic Coast Conference 2005 Player of the Year and Offensive Player of the Year.  He graduated as the school's career leader in seven major categories, including rushing yards (4,032), scoring (240 points), rushing touchdowns (40), total touchdowns (40), all-purpose yards (4,930), 200-yard rushing games (3) and 1,000 yard rushing seasons (3).

Professional career

Cleveland Browns
Barclay was originally signed by the Browns as an undrafted free agent out of Wake Forest. However, Barclay was waived by the team at the end of training camp. Barclay was then signed to the Browns' practice squad and subsequently to the team's active roster.

Following the 2006 season, Barclay was allocated to NFL Europa where he became the starting running back for the Berlin Thunder.  He was the Week 4 Special Teams player of the week after returning 5 kicks for 180 yards, including a 99-yard touchdown.

In his first action with the Browns during the 2007 preseason, he returned a kick-off 88 yards for the game-winning touchdown against the Kansas City Chiefs. He began the regular season on the team's practice squad, where he spent the first 11 weeks of the season.

Tennessee Titans
On November 22, 2007, Barclay was signed off the Cleveland Browns practice squad onto the active roster of the Tennessee Titans to replace Chris Henry, who had been suspended.

New Orleans Saints
On December 24, 2007, Barclay was claimed by the New Orleans Saints off waivers from the Tennessee Titans. He suffered a sprain knee on July 29, 2008 in training camp and was subsequently placed on injured reserve. He was later released with an injury settlement.

Atlanta Falcons
Barclay was signed to the Atlanta Falcons practice squad on October 14, 2008.

New York Sentinels
Barclay was signed by the New York Sentinels of the United Football League on September 9, 2009.

Coaching career
After spending the 2011 season as a graduate assistant at Wake Forest, Barclay was hired as the running backs coach at William & Mary for the 2012 season. In March 2014, Barclay accepted a job at the same position at Marshall.

References

External links
 
Wake Forest Demon Deacons bio
United Football League bio
Just Sports Stats
Purdue bio

1983 births
Living people
Players of American football from Louisville, Kentucky
American football running backs
Wake Forest Demon Deacons football players
Cleveland Browns players
Berlin Thunder players
Tennessee Titans players
New Orleans Saints players
New York Sentinels players
Wake Forest Demon Deacons football coaches
William & Mary Tribe football coaches
Marshall Thundering Herd football coaches
Sportspeople from Louisville, Kentucky
Louisville Male High School alumni
Western Kentucky Hilltoppers football coaches
Purdue Boilermakers football coaches
Louisville Cardinals football coaches